Franz Hölbl (27 December 1927 – 1976) was an Austrian weightlifter. He competed at the 1952 Summer Olympics and the 1956 Summer Olympics.

References

External links
 

1927 births
1976 deaths
Austrian male weightlifters
Olympic weightlifters of Austria
Weightlifters at the 1952 Summer Olympics
Weightlifters at the 1956 Summer Olympics
Place of birth missing
World Weightlifting Championships medalists
20th-century Austrian people